Wesley Methodist Cathedral is a Methodist cathedral located in Kumasi, Ghana. Wesley is the largest Methodist church in the area, and is the center of the episcopal area in Adum, Kumasi.  The cathedral is named after John Wesley, one of the founders of the Methodist church.

References

Kumasi
Churches in Kumasi